Luis Feliciano is an American professional boxer who has held the WBC-NABF super lightweight title since 2019.

Professional career
After getting his bachelors from Marquette University, Feliciano made his professional debut on February 17, 2017, scoring a six-round unanimous decision (UD) victory over Angel Rodriguez at the Belasco Theater in Los Angeles, California.

After compiling a record of 12–0 (8 KOs) he faced Genaro Gamez for the vacant WBC-NABF super lightweight title on August 22, 2019, at the Fantasy Springs Resort Casino in Indio, California. Feliciano captured his first professional title via UD in a mostly one-sided fight, with one judge scoring the bout 99–91 and the other two scoring it 98–92. He returned to the Fantasy Springs Resort Casino on December 13 to successfully defend his title against Herbert Acevedo. In a fight which saw Acevedo knocked down heavily in the third round, Feliciano won by UD over ten rounds with the judges' scorecards reading 100–89, 99–90, and 97–92.

Professional boxing record

References

External links

Living people
Year of birth missing (living people)
Date of birth missing (living people)
American male boxers
Boxers from Wisconsin
Sportspeople from Milwaukee
Light-welterweight boxers